Johan Verner Weckman (26 July 1882 – 22 February 1968) was a wrestler, who is the first Finnish Olympic gold medalist.

Wrestling 

He was inspired to take up wrestling at the age of 15. He joined the club Helsingfors Gymnastikklubben in 1902, then moved to Helsingin Atleettiklubi in 1903. He won the Finnish national Greco-Roman heavyweight championship in 1904. Then he moved to Germany, where he joined the club Germania Karlsruhe.

He won the unofficial Greco-Roman heavyweight world title in Duisburg in 1905.

Weckman was the initiating force behind Finland sending a team to the 1906 Intercalated Games. He was being pressured by the German Imperial committee for Olympic Games to change citizenship and to join the German team, but Weckman insisted on representing Finland. He found a private financial supporter, and four Finnish competitors travelled to Athens. He won gold in his class:

The all-around event was exclusively for class-winners, and no physical medals were awarded for the three participants.

He was nominated into the 1908 Finnish Olympic team without trials.

According to rumours, Weckman bribed Saarela to throw the final. Modern sportswriters Arto Teronen and Jouko Vuolle consider there to be plenty of circumstantial evidence in favour.

He retired from wrestling after the 1908 games.

Weckman is the first Finn to win an Olympic gold, both including and excluding the Intercalated Games, and the first Finnish wrestler to win a world championship, although unofficially. Weckman also joked that he was the first Russian Olympic winner, when he met with Soviets during negotiations for the Finnish war reparations to the Soviet Union.

He donated his gold medals to the Sports Museum of Finland.

Business career 

He completed his matriculation exam at the Helsinki Swedish Real Lyceum in 1902 and then studied at the Helsinki Polytechnical Institute. He moved abroad in 1904 to avoid conscription. He studied briefly in ETH Zurich and then moved to Karlsruhe Institute of Technology.

Weckman graduated as a Master of Science in mechanical engineering in 1907 and electrical engineering in 1908. He briefly served in Westinghouse Electric Corporation in France in 1909, and then worked as a technical director in asbestos mining in the Ural Mountains until 1921. Then he returned to Finland, where he worked at the Kaapelitehdas, first as a technical director in 1921–1937, then its chief executive officer in 1937–1955. He remained in the company board after retirement.

He was a deputy board member of The Finnish Employers' Confederation in 1942–1947 and board member in metal industry and engineering associations.

Accolades 

He is an honorary chairman of Helsingin Atleettiklubi.

He was awarded the honorary title vuorineuvos in 1953.

He received the following honorary awards:
 Order of the Cross of Liberty, 2nd and 3rd class
 Commander, First Class, of the Order of the Lion of Finland
 Commemorative Medal of the Winter War
 The medal for protesters against Russian military draft 1905–1906
 Cross of Merit, in gold, of the Finnish Sports

There is a memorial dedicated to him in his birth town Loviisa. Made by Matti Haupt in 1963, Olympic rings were added to it in 2010.

Talouselämä magazine listed Weckman among the 100 most significant business executives of Finland's history in 2012.

Family 

His parents were farm owner Anders Weckman and Fredrika Johansson.

His first marriage was to Ingrid Suoma Regina Svedberg (1889–1947) in 1910. They had two children:
 Gunnel Ingrid Emilia (1914–)
 Per Verner Anders (1916–)
He became a widow in 1947, and married Dagmar Maria Falin (former Lund) (1894–) in 1948.

References

1882 births
1968 deaths
People from Loviisa
People from Uusimaa Province (Grand Duchy of Finland)
Olympic wrestlers of Finland
Wrestlers at the 1906 Intercalated Games
Wrestlers at the 1908 Summer Olympics
Finnish male sport wrestlers
Olympic gold medalists for Finland
Olympic silver medalists for Finland
Nokia people
Olympic medalists in wrestling
Medalists at the 1908 Summer Olympics
Medalists at the 1906 Intercalated Games
World Wrestling Championships medalists
Sportspeople from Uusimaa
19th-century Finnish people
20th-century Finnish people